Pristimantis affinis is an endangered species of frog in the family Strabomantidae.
It is endemic to Colombia.
Its natural habitats are tropical high-altitude shrubland and grassland.
It is threatened by habitat loss.

References

affinis
Endemic fauna of Colombia
Amphibians of Colombia
Amphibians of the Andes
Amphibians described in 1899
Taxonomy articles created by Polbot